Philippide may refer to:

Philippide, poem by William the Breton about Philip Augustus
Alexandru I. Philippide  1859–1933), Romanian linguist and philologist
Alexandru A. Philippide (1900–1979), Romanian poet